Newpower Soul is the third and final studio album by The New Power Generation, but is considered a de facto Prince album (his stage name at that time being an unpronounceable symbol). The album was announced as a "Prince" album in a press release issued by his publicist, but mere days later his official website at the time claimed those were mere rumors.

The album title has a long history in Prince's songs. In 1988, "New Power Soul" was a lyric in the Lovesexy top ten hit, "Alphabet St." and was also part of the album art (written in the form of an arrow). A year later, the hit "Batdance" also had a segment repeating "Power Soul". This was sampled later on Carmen Electra's debut album (which was primarily written by Prince). The 1992 song "Love 2 the 9's", from the Love Symbol Album, features the lyrics "Stay awake 4 4teen hours, Listen 2 the band play New Power Soul". In 1995, The New Power Generation's second album, Exodus contained a mostly instrumental track with the title "New Power Soul" and a spoken outtake from the album prompted the listener to await the next NPG album, Newpower Soul.  "New Power" was contracted to "Newpower" for the later album and song.  The concept is most likely related to the New Power Generation, which was also mentioned back on Lovesexy.

Reception

The album sold relatively poorly despite promotional efforts and many of the reviews for the album were poor as well. The title track reuses the music from "Big Fun", from the album Exodus.  The album is currently the last from the New Power Generation, as their own entity.

The album is noted by fans for a few key tracks such as "The One", "Come On" (featuring vocals by Chaka Khan) and the bonus hidden track "Wasted Kisses".

Track listing
 "Newpower Soul"
 "Mad Sex"
 "Until U're in My Arms Again"
 "When U Love Somebody"
 "Shoo-Bed-Ooh"
 "Push It Up"
 "Freaks on This Side"
 "Come On"
 "The One"
 "(I Like) Funky Music"
 "Wasted Kisses" (3:07) – hidden track, following silent tracks 11–48.

Charts

Notes

1998 albums
New Power Generation albums
Albums produced by Prince (musician)
NPG Records albums